Seticosta phrixotricha is a species of moth of the family Tortricidae. It is found in Peru, Brazil (Paraná), Ecuador (Loja Province) and Bolivia.

The wingspan is 23.5 mm. The forewings are greyish brown, spotted with blackish brown. There are some whitish spots, mainly along the costa. The hindwings are dirty whitish, mixed with greyish apicad and strigulaed (finely streaked) with grey.

Etymology
The proper word for hair in ancient Greek is however .

References

Moths described in 2004
Seticosta